Water Power is a pornographic film directed by Shaun Costello. Released circa 1976, it was loosely based on the real-life exploits of the Illinois "Enema bandit", Michael H. Kenyon, who administered forced enemas to female college students in the 1960s and 1970s. The film stars Jamie Gillis as a disturbed loner. In preparing for his role, Gillis reportedly asked to be flown to Illinois to interview the man his character was based upon. His request was denied.

Cast
 Jamie Gillis as Burt
 John Buco as Jack Gallagher
 C.J. Laing as Irena Murray
 Eric Edwards as The Doctor
 Marlene Willoughby as The Nurse
 Gloria Leonard as Hostess at the Garden of Eden
 Clea Carson as Stewardess
 Long Jeanne Silver as The Patient
 Crystal Sync as Barbara
 Philip Marlowe as Police Captain
 Susaye London as Ginger
 Barbara Belkin as Candy
 Craig Esposito as Police Station Cop with Typewriter
 Sharon Mitchell as Eve
 Sally O'Neil
 Shaun Costello as Police Station Cop/Man at Car Window
 Fred Keitel
 Leo Lovemore as Stewardess's Boyfriend
 Peter Christian
 Beverly Steig
 Roger Caine

References

External links
 

1976 films
Crime films based on actual events
1970s crime films
American crime films
1970s pornographic films
Pornographic horror films
Films set in New York City
American pornographic films
Films shot in New York City
1970s English-language films
1970s American films